Xia Yan (30 October 1900 – 6 February 1995) was a Chinese playwright and screenwriter, and China's Deputy Minister of Culture between 1954 and 1965.

Among the dozens of plays and screenplays penned by Xia Yan, the most renowned include Under the Eaves of Shanghai (1937) and The Fascist Bacillus (1944). Today the Xia Yan Film Literature Award is named in his honour.

Personal life 
Xia entered Zhejiang Industrial School (a technical school of Zhejiang University) in 1915, five years before being sent to study in Japan. He was forced to return in 1927, two years after graduating with an engineering degree.

Political career 
On Xia's return in 1927  expelled by Japanese authorities for his political activity  he joined the Communist Party of China and rose to become a cultural chief in the Shanghai municipality, and then Deputy Minister of Culture in 1954.

In 1961, Xia wrote an essay called "Raise Our Country's Film Art to a New Level". The essay, implicitly critical of the Great Leap Forward, called for greater autonomy for artists and more diversity within Chinese cinema. The implementation of his directives is said to have led to the achievement of a "tremendous diversity" which lasted until the Cultural Revolution.

Xia is credited with introducing Soviet cinema to China, and helped to establish a realist tradition that emphasised active engagement with national issues, leaving a strong legacy that continued into the post-Mao era.

Xia's political career ended in 1965, when he was removed from office and spent eight years in prison during the Cultural Revolution.

Notes

References and further reading
 
 .

External links
 Feature on Xia Yan in Chinese Movies
 Hangzhou Former Residence of Xia Yan

1900 births
1995 deaths
Chinese dramatists and playwrights
Screenwriters from Zhejiang
People's Republic of China politicians from Zhejiang
Zhejiang University alumni
Academic staff of Zhejiang University
Republic of China translators
People's Republic of China translators
Writers from Hangzhou
Politicians from Hangzhou
Victims of the Cultural Revolution
20th-century Chinese translators
20th-century Chinese dramatists and playwrights
20th-century screenwriters